Dongguan United Football Club is a professional Chinese football club that currently participates in the China League Two. The team is based in Dongguan, Guangdong.

History
Dongguan Machong Rongyi F.C. was founded on 19 October 2016 in the town of Machong, in Dongguan. The club changed its name to Guangdong Rongyi F.C. in 2017 and Guangdong Lianghetang F.C. in 2019. The club won Chinese Champions League in 2020 and was promoted to China League Two. In 2021, the club changed its name to Dongguan United F.C.

Name history
2016: Dongguan Machong Rongyi F.C. (东莞麻涌融易)
2017–2018: Guangdong Rongyi F.C. (广东融易)
2019–2020: Guangdong Lianghetang F.C. (广东良和堂)
2021–present: Dongguan United F.C. (东莞莞联)

Players

Current squad

References

External links
Soccerway

Dongguan United F.C.
Association football clubs established in 2016
Sport in Guangdong
2016 establishments in China